Diana Mirian Miloslavich Túpac is a Peruvian politician. She served as Minister of Women and Vulnerable Populations from February until August 2022. She was born in Huancayo.

References

Year of birth missing (living people)
Living people
21st-century Peruvian politicians
21st-century Peruvian women politicians
Women's ministers of Peru
Women government ministers of Peru
People from Huancayo